Pat and Mike is a 1952 American romantic comedy film starring Spencer Tracy and Katharine Hepburn.  The movie was written by Ruth Gordon and Garson Kanin, and directed by George Cukor. Cukor directed The Philadelphia Story (1940) with Hepburn, and Cukor, Gordon and Kanin teamed with Hepburn and Tracy again for Adam's Rib (1949). Gordon and Kanin were nominated for the 1952 Academy Award for Best Original Screenplay. for their work on Pat and Mike. (They had been similarly honored for Adam's Rib.)

Hepburn was nominated in the Best Actress category at the 10th Golden Globe Awards, while Ray was nominated for "New Star of the Year".

Plot 
Pat Pemberton (Katharine Hepburn) is a brilliant athlete who loses her confidence whenever her charming but overbearing fiancé Collier (William Ching) is around. Women's golf and tennis championships are within her reach; however, she gets flustered by his presence at the contests. He wants her to give up her goal and marry him, but Pat does not give up on herself that easily. She enlists the help of Mike Conovan (Spencer Tracy), a slightly shady sports promoter. Together they face mobsters, a jealous boxer (Aldo Ray), and a growing mutual attraction.

Cast

 Spencer Tracy as Mike Conovan
 Katharine Hepburn as Pat Pemberton
 Aldo Ray as Davie Hucko
 William Ching as Collier Weld
 Sammy White as Barney Grau
 George Mathews as Spec Cauley
 Loring Smith as Mr. Beminger
 Phyllis Povah as Mrs. Beminger
 Charles Buchinski as Hank Tasling
 Frank Richards as Sam Garsell
 Jim Backus as Charles Barry 
 Chuck Connors as Police Captain
 Joseph E. Bernard as Gibby
 Owen McGiveney as Harry MacWade
 Lou Lubin as Waiter
 Carl "Alfalfa" Switzer as Bus Boy
 William Self as Pat Pemberton's Caddy

Sports Stars

 Gussie Moran as Herself
 Babe Didrikson Zaharias as Herself
 Don Budge as Himself
 Alice Marble as Herself 
 Frank Parker as Himself
 Betty Hicks as Herself
 Beverly Hanson as Herself
 Helen Dettweiler as Herself

Production

Development
Garson Kanin and Ruth Gordon were friends with Hepburn and Tracy, and had the idea of writing a film to showcase Hepburn's athletic abilities. She was an avid golfer and tennis player, and indeed performed all the sports footage in the film herself.

Filming
Pat and Mike was filmed partly on location in California. The golfing scenes were filmed at the Riviera Country Club and Ojai Valley Inn.  Tennis scenes were filmed at the Cow Palace in Daly City, near San Francisco.  The opening scenes were filmed at Occidental College, standing in as fictional Pacific Technical College.

Casting
Many notable athletes appear in cameo roles as themselves in the film, including golfers Babe Didrikson Zaharias, Betty Hicks, and Helen Dettweiler, and tennis champions Don Budge, Gussie Moran and Alice Marble. Other notables in the cast include Charles Bronson (credited as Charles Buchinski) in his second credited movie role, Carl "Alfalfa" Switzer, Jim Backus, and, in his acting debut, former athlete Chuck Connors, later known as the star of The Rifleman television series.

Music
The score for the film was composed and conducted by David Raksin, with orchestrations by Robert Franklyn and Ruby Raksin.  Of his music, Raksin said "My music was sly and a mite jazzy, and despite the fact that everyone seemed to like it, so did I."

The complete score was issued on CD in 2009, on Film Score Monthly records.

Reception
According to MGM records the film earned $2,050,000 in the US and Canada and $646,000 elsewhere, resulting in a profit of $74,000.

In his June 19, 1952 review in The New York Times, Bosley Crowther praised the film as  “a pleasing blue-plate of al fresco warm-weather fare… a shaky combination of, let us say, Woman of the Year and (if you can imagine without music) the theatrical Guys and Dolls. But, withal, it is a likable fable about a highly coordinated dame who moves in upon and takes over a positive, authoritative guy, with slight overtones of honor triumphing over shadiness and greed. And it is smoothly directed by George Cukor and slyly, amusingly played by the whole cast, especially by its due of easy, adroit, experienced stars. Mr. Ray, as a dumb, moody fighter; Sammy White, as a shifty hanger-on, and William Ching, as the stuffed-shirt fiancé, are outstanding in support. George Mathews and Charles Buchinski are also fun as "the kind of types that have been known to act very hot-headed in their day and age." (They are neatly manhandled by Miss Hepburn, using judo, in one scene.) And, as for the real professional athletes and the exhibitions they give, they are credible, colorful and exciting. That's enough in these hot summer days.”

Variety wrote: “The smooth-working team of Spencer Tracy and Katharine Hepburn spark the fun… Hepburn is quite believable as a femme athlete taken under the wing of promoter Tracy. Film settles down to a series of laugh sequences of training, exhibitions and cross-country tours in which Hepburn proves to be a star.  Tracy is given some choice lines in the script and makes much of them in an easy, throwaway style that lifts the comedy punch.”

Garson and Kanin were nominated for the Academy Award for Best Original Screenplay. TCM notes: “Husband and wife screenwriters Kanin and Gordon wrote Pat and Mike specifically for their actor friends, tailoring the script to the streak of devilish humor lurking beneath Tracy's solid, consummately male persona and taking advantage of Hepburn's natural athletic abilities as a superior golfer and one of the best tennis players in Hollywood…. The combination of Tracy's gruff, working-class demeanor and Hepburn's ladylike, patrician bearing provides Pat and Mike with some of its best comic moments, as when Mike, watching Pat walk across a golf course green, remarks to his partner in a thick Brooklyn accent “There's not much meat on 'er, but what there is, is cherce."  (The American Film Institute says it is a Bronx accent.) Such earthy humor endeared Pat and Mike to both critics and audiences and undoubtedly helped win...(the) nomination.... (The) witty script also took great advantage of the cozy, intimate rapport between Hepburn and Tracy who were an off-screen couple as well, and played upon the apparently mismatched but sizzling chemistry between the two lovers...As with Adam's Rib, Pat and Mike is an honest, amusing account of the battle between the sexes, but also a celebration of male-female chemistry made all the more exciting when the romantic leads are also equals, a specialty of the Kanin-Gordon writing style.” On Rotten Tomatoes, the film has an aggregate score of 85% based on 23 positive and 4 negative critic reviews. The website's consensus reads: "Katharine Hepburn and Spencer Tracy take competition to a romantic-comic highpoint in this elegantly directed sports comedy by George Cukor."

See also

 List of American films of 1952

References

External links 
 
 
 
 

1952 films
1952 romantic comedy films
American romantic comedy films
American sports comedy films
American black-and-white films
1950s English-language films
Films directed by George Cukor
Films scored by David Raksin
Films about women's sports
Films shot in Colorado
Films shot in Los Angeles
Golf films
Metro-Goldwyn-Mayer films
Occidental College
1950s American films